Iglesia de Santa María (Luanco) is a church in Asturias, Spain.

References

Churches in Asturias
Bien de Interés Cultural landmarks in Asturias